Interstate 110 may refer to:
Interstate 110 (California), a north–south freeway running through Los Angeles, California
Interstate 110 (Florida), a spur route in Pensacola, Florida
Interstate 110 (Louisiana), a spur route in Baton Rouge, Louisiana
Interstate 110 (Mississippi), a spur route in Biloxi, Mississippi
Interstate 110 (Texas), a spur route in El Paso, Texas
The stub of the San Bernardino Freeway west of I-5, formerly designated as Interstate 110 and now legislatively part of I-10

10-1
1